Doublefinger Peak is a peak about 4 nautical miles (7 km) inland from Granite Harbour, just northeast of Mount Marston, in Victoria Land. It was named by the British Antarctic Expedition (1910–13). A snow filled cleft along the east face of the peak separates two dark rock exposures, suggesting the origin of the name.

References 

Mountains of Victoria Land
Scott Coast